Åland is an archipelago of over 6,000 islands in the Baltic Sea. Constitutionally, it is a Swedish-speaking autonomous province of Finland. Sea travel is a vital part of Åland's economy and a major local employer. The main ports are located at the capital Mariehamn in the south, at Berghamn in the west and at Långnäs on the east shore of Fasta Åland (the main island).

Air 
Nordic Regional Airlines flies to Mariehamn Airport, operating for Finnair. On the island of Kumlinge there is an air strip and a helicopter landing place that is not frequented by regular flights but only by chartered flights.

Roads 

The islands have quiet roads that are much appreciated by cyclists. Several main roads have separate cycle lanes. There are Ålandstrafiken local bus services operating in conjunction with the inter-island ferries.

Road vehicles registered in Åland have number plates with blue lettering starting with ÅL.

Red granite is used as a road surface so both gravel and tarmac roads tend to be red in Åland.

Sea 

The Silja Line, Viking Line and Tallink ferries operating between Helsinki, Turku or Tallinn and Stockholm call briefly at Åland, at either Mariehamn or Långnäs, Lumparland. As well as providing useful transport links, this also permits the sale of duty-free alcohol etc. on board the ships. This is due to Åland's special constitutional status and exemption from normal European Union rules on Value Added Tax and other tariffs, negotiated by Finland as part of talks leading to membership of the EU in 1995. Vessels must call at an Åland port to qualify.

A network of ferries operated by Ålandstrafiken provide inter-island services (and links with Galtby, Pargas and Vuosnainen, Kustavi ferry harbours in Mainland Finland).

Eckerö Linjen operates a ferry service between Berghamn port in Eckerö, Åland and Grisslehamn port in Norrtälje Municipality, Sweden, while Finnlines operates a service from Naantali, Mainland Finland to Kapellskär (also in Norrtälje Municipality), Sweden via Långnäs.

References

External links

Air Åland
Ålandstrafiken
Visit Åland website: travel information
Destination Åland provides online booking of ferries to and from Åland as well as accommodation on Åland

Transport in Åland